The Albert Falcou Cup, also called Albert Falcou French Cup, is an annual knock-out competition organised by the Fédération Française de Rugby à XIII for amateur rugby league clubs in France.

History 

The competition was introduced in 1937 and was originally known as the French Amateur Cup. The inaugural winners were the short-lived La Rochelle club (during World War II the club was forced to merge with the city's rugby union club, Atlantique Stade Rochelais, by the Vichy Government of the time).

When rugby league was legalised again at the end of the war, the cup was re-instituted as the National Cup. This incarnation was contested between 1945 and 1962. Two now-defunct clubs dominated the post war years; the Biganos-based Facture XIII won the cup five times and Lavardac XIII (from the eponymous Lot-et-Garonne town), which folded in the 1980s, won it on four occasions.

The tournament was not played between 1963 and 1976.

It was relaunched in 1977 as the French Federal Cup. Since 1992, the competing clubs have vied for the Albert Falcou Cup, named in memory of audois rugby league official Albert Falcou (1911–1990), one of the main protagonists of the game's post World War II resurgence.

Past winners 

French Amateur Cup
1937 : La Rochelle XIII
1938 : Arcachon XIII
1939 : RC Saint-Gaudens

National Cup
1945 : Orange XIII
1946 : Orange XIII
1947 : Figeac XIII
1948 : RC Carpentras
1949 : Arachon XIII
1950 : Lavardac XIII
1951 : Lavardac XIII
1952 : Lavardac XIII
1953 : Lavardac XIII
1954 : La Réole XIII
1955 : Bordeaux Facture XIII
1956 : Limoux Grizzlies
1957 : Bordeaux Facture XIII
1958 : Bordeaux Facture XIII
1959 : Miramont XIII
1960 : Bordeaux Facture XIII
1961 : Saint-Gaudens Bears 'A'
1962 : Bordeaux Facture XIII

Federal Cup
1977 : La Réole XIII
1978 : Not Played
1979 : Montpellier Red Devils
1980 : AS Clairac XIII
1981 : Aspet XIII
1982 : Saint-Laurent XIII
1983 : US Apt XIII
1984 : Palau XIII Broncos
1985 : Not Played
1986 : RC Lescure-Arthes XIII
1987 : Sainte-Livrade XIII
1988 : La Réole XIII
1989 : Le Pontet XIII
1990 : Tonneins XIII
1991 : RC Lescure-Arthes XIII

Coupe Falcou
1992 : Cabestany XIII
1993 : Cabestany XIII
1994 : Sainte-Livrade XIII
1995 : Gifi Bias XIII
1996 : Saint-Cyprien
1997 : Morières XIII
1998 : Castelnau XIII
1999 : Le Barcarès XIII
2000 : Sainte-Livrade XIII
2001 : Palau XIII Broncos
2002 : Sainte-Livrade XIII
2003 : Gifi Bias XIII
2004 : Salses XIII
2005 : Salses XIII
2006 : Baroudeurs de Pia XIII
2007 : Sauveterre de Comminges XIII
2008 : Baroudeurs de Pia XIII
2009 : Le Barcares XIII
2010 : Gratentour XIII
2011 : Ornaisons XIII
2012 : US Ferrals XIII
2013 : Sporting Club Saint-Laurent Treize
2014 : Sporting Club Saint-Laurent Treize
2015 : 
2016 : Salses XIII
2017 : Le Soler XIII

See also

Rugby league in France
French rugby league system
National Division 2
Lord Derby Cup
Paul Dejean Cup

References

External links

Rugby league competitions in France